Tigran Sargsian's government was the governing body of Armenia from April 2008 to April 2014. Tigran Sargsyan was designated Prime Minister by President Serzh Sargsyan in April 2008.

It was a coalition government formed by Republican Party, Prosperous Armenia, Rule of Law party and ARF.

The cabinet consisted of eighteen ministries and eight adjunct bodies. Each ministry is responsible for elaborating and implementing governmental decisions in its respective sphere.

Structure

Ministries
'''
|Prime Minister
|Tigran Sargsyan
|Republican Party
|9 April 2008
|-
|Minister of Defense
|Seyran Ohanyan
|Independent
|14 April 2008
|-
|Chief of the staff of the Government
|David Sargsyan
|Republican Party
|22 April 2008
|-
|Minister of Healthcare
|Harutyun Kushkyan
|Prosperous Armenia
|1 June 2007
|-
|Minister of Economy
|Tigran Davtyan
|Republican Party
|December 2010
|-
|Minister of Education and Science
|Armen Ashotyan
|Republican Party
|13 May 2009
|-
|Minister of Foreign Affairs
|Eduard Nalbandyan
|Independent
|15 April 2008
|-
|Minister of Nature Protection
|Aram Harutyunyan
|Republican Party
|1 June 2007
|-
|Minister of Emergency Situations
|Mher Shahgeldyan
|Rule of Law
|1 April 2008
|-
|Minister of Culture
|Hasmik Poghosyan
|Independent
|1 June 2007
|-
|Minister of Agriculture
|Sergo Karapetyan
|Rule of Law
|31 December 2010
|-
|Minister of Energy and Natural Resources
|Armen Movsisyan
|Republican Party
|8 June 2007
|-
|Minister of Transport and Communications
|Gurgen Sargsyan
|Rule of Law Party
|21 April 2008
|-
|Minister of Finance
|Vache Gabrielyan
|Republican Party
|December 2010
|-
|Minister of Territorial Administration
|Armen Gevorgyan
|Independent
|21 April 2008
|-
|Minister of Urban Development
|Vardan Vardanyan
|Prosperous Armenia
|1 April 2008
|-
|Minister of Justice
|Gevorg Danielyan
|Republican Party
|20 June 2007
|-
|Minister of Diaspora
|Hranush Hacobyan
|Republican Party
|1 October 2008
|-
|Minister of Labor and Social Affairs
|Mkhitar Mnatsakanyan
|Prosperous Armenia
|23 November 2009
|-
|Minister of Sport and Youth Affairs
|Hrachya Rostomyan
|Independent
|16 June 2012
|}

References 

Politics of Armenia
Political organizations based in Armenia
Government of Armenia
European governments